Compilation Deluxe  (Цомпліатыён делюкс) is a name of a 1971 bootlegged Beatles album containing their hits from 1966 until 1970 that was widely distributed across the Byelorussian Soviet Socialist Republic, particularly in Minsk and Barysaw. Bootlegging music was common in the former Soviet Union as the authorities compared western music to social parasitism. Compilation Deluxe was largely recorded on coated paper as the pressing facilities to create vinyl records was usually unavailable in Belarus.

Track listing

References

The Beatles compilation albums
1971 compilation albums